The initials PCHS can stand for one of several different schools:

Pacific Coast High School
Palisades Charter High School
Pamlico County High School (North Carolina), a high school in North Carolina
Panther Creek High School (North Carolina)
Panther Creek High School (Texas)
Paramus Catholic High School
Park Center High School
Park City High School
Parkersburg Catholic High School
Parkway Central High School
Pasquotank County High School
Patrick County High School
Paulding County High School
Pekin Community High School (disambiguation)
Pershing County High School, a high school in Nevada
Pierrefonds Community High School
Pine City High School
Pine Creek High School
Pinecrest High School
Plainfield Central High School
Plant City High School
Platte County High School
Portage Central High School
Port Charlotte High School
Port Chester High School
Powers Catholic High School
Prairie Central High School
Prudhoe Community High School
Putnam City High School